This is a list of Members of Parliament (MPs) elected to the House of Commons of the United Kingdom by Welsh constituencies for the Fifty-Fifth Parliament of the United Kingdom (2010 to 2015).

It includes both MPs elected at the 2010 general election, held on 6 May 2010, and those subsequently elected in by-elections.

The list is sorted by the name of the MP, and MPs who did not serve throughout the Parliament are italicised. New MPs elected since the general election are noted at the bottom of the page.

Composition before 2015 election

MPs

By-elections
 2012 Cardiff South and Penarth by-election

See also
 2010 United Kingdom general election
 List of MPs elected in the 2010 United Kingdom general election
 List of MPs for constituencies in England (2010–2015)
 List of MPs for constituencies in Northern Ireland (2010–2015)
 List of MPs for constituencies in Scotland (2010–2015)

References

Wales
2010-
MPs